The 1952 Calgary Stampeders finished in 3rd place in the W.I.F.U. with a 7–9 record. They were defeated in the W.I.F.U. Semi-Finals by the Edmonton Eskimos.

Regular season

Season standings

Season schedule

Playoffs

SEMI-FINALS

Edmonton won the total-point series by 42–38. The Eskimos will play the Winnipeg Blue Bombers in the WIFU Finals.

References

Calgary Stampeders seasons
1952 Canadian football season by team